Rafael Fernández Martínez (born 5 May 1989), commonly known as Chumbi, is a Spanish footballer who plays for Marbella FC as a forward.

Club career
Born in Águilas, Region of Murcia, Chumbi started playing as a senior with Atlético Madrid's C-team. In summer 2009 he joined Caravaca CF of Segunda División B but, in the following transfer window, returned to Tercera División by signing with Lorca Deportiva CF.

In July 2010, Chumbi moved to CF Reus Deportiu still in the fourth division. In his first season he scored 12 goals (three of them in the play-offs), helping the Catalans return to the third level after five years.

In January 2012, Chumbi was linked with a move to Elche CF, but the deal could not be completed. On 20 June he signed a contract with UD Almería, being assigned to the reserves in division three.

Chumbi made his debut with Almería's first team on 17 October 2012, coming off the bench for Jonathan in the 83rd minute of a 3–0 home win against AD Alcorcón for the campaign's Copa del Rey. He made his first appearance in Segunda División two months later, replacing Ángel Trujillo in a 0–1 defeat at Elche CF; he netted his first goal as a professional on 6 January of the following year, being pivotal in the Andalusians' 1–0 away win against Girona FC after only six minutes on the field.

On 8 July 2013, Chumbi was released by Almería. Late in the same month, he joined Valencia CF Mestalla in the third tier.

On 10 July 2014, Chumbi signed a two-year deal with Albacete Balompié, recently promoted to the second division. On 20 July of the following year, he moved to fellow league club UE Llagostera. Following 19 goalless appearances and team relegation, he returned to his native region and the third level after joining Lorca FC.

After being sidelined for 15 months with a serious knee injury, Chumbi signed for Real Murcia of the third tier on 13 July 2018.

References

External links

1989 births
Living people
Spanish footballers
Footballers from the Region of Murcia
Association football forwards
Segunda División players
Segunda División B players
Tercera División players
Atlético Madrid C players
Caravaca CF players
Lorca Deportiva CF footballers
CF Reus Deportiu players
UD Almería B players
UD Almería players
Valencia CF Mestalla footballers
Albacete Balompié players
UE Costa Brava players
Lorca FC players
Real Murcia players
Marbella FC players